Gabriel Aeppli, PhD FRS (born 25 November 1956 in Zurich)  is a Swiss-American electrical engineer, co-founder of the London Centre for Nanotechnology and professor of physics at ETH Zürich and EPF Lausanne, and head of the Synchrotron and Nanotechnology department of the Paul Scherrer Institute, also in Switzerland.

He has contributed to spectroscopy on the magnetism of disordered systems and on high-temperature superconductors and antiferromagnetism identifying magnets with tuneable quantum fluctuations that can be used to study the transition between classical and quantum behavior. His work has helped to demonstrate that quantum spin fluctuations underlie exotic superconductivity.

He has been recipient of multiple honors and he has more than 290 peer review publications, 14,054 total citations by 9,542 documents and h-index of 70.

Life 
Son of mathematician Alfred Aeppli and Dorothee Aeppli, Gabriel was born in Zürich 25 November 1956.

Shortly after birth, Gabriel Aeppli moved from Zürich, with his father, to the United States.

He lived in London, United Kingdom from 2002 to 2015 when he moved back to Zürich.

Career 
He studied at the Massachusetts Institute of Technology, where he in 1978 obtained a B.Sc. in mathematics. and PhD, M.Sc. & B.Sc, in electrical engineering (1983).

He was a research assistant at MIT and industrial co-op student of IBM. From 1982 he was at the Bell Laboratories hired in 1993 as a distinguished member of the technical staff. From 1996 to 2002, he was a senior research scientist at the NEC Laboratories in Princeton.

From 2002, as Quain Professor of Physics at University College London (UCL,) he helped to found the London Centre for Nanotechnology, where he acted as director until March 2015.

His current technical focus is on the implications of photon science and nanotechnology for information processing and health care. He is a board member of Bio Nano Consulting.

Currently, he is the director of Synchrotron Radiation and Nanotechnology at the Paul Scherrer Institute.

Research 

 Kondo insulator
 Scale-free network

Honors 
 2015 Fellow National Academy of Sciences
 2012 Member of the American Academy of Arts and Sciences
 2010 Fellow of the Royal Society
 2008 Institute of Physics: Mott Medal and Prize
 2005 American Physical Society: Oliver E. Buckley Condensed Matter Prize
 2005 Majumdar Memorial Award of the Indian Association for the Cultivation of Science
 2003 Neel Medal (magnetism prize of IUPAP)
 2002 Riso National Laboratory Fellow
 2002 Royal Society Wolfson Research Merit Award
 1997 Fellow of the American Physical Society
 1996 Fellow of the Japan Society for the Promotion of Science

In addition, he has been a member and chairman of many panels, sponsored by the USDOE, American Physical Society, EPSRC, and National Research Council (US), among others.

Books

 "Neutron Scattering from Random Ferromagnets", Gabriel Aeppli, 1982 - 310 pages
 "Quantum Phase Transitions in Transverse Field Models", Amit Dutta, Gabriel Aeppli, Bikas K. Chakrabarti, Uma Divakaran, Thomas F. Rosenbaum, Diptiman Sen, Cambridge University Press, 28 Jan 2015 - Science - 360 pages

References

1956 births
Living people
MIT School of Engineering alumni
21st-century American physicists
Fellows of the Royal Society
Members of the United States National Academy of Sciences
Fellows of the American Academy of Arts and Sciences
NEC people
Quantum information scientists
Fellows of the American Physical Society
Oliver E. Buckley Condensed Matter Prize winners